Sjöberg (variations in other versions of the Latin alphabet, Sjöberg or Sjøberg, or Americanized as Seaberg, Seaborg or Showberg), is a Swedish surname which may refer to:

People

Poets
Birger Sjöberg (1885–1929), Swedish poet
Erik Sjöberg (1794–1828), Swedish poet
Nils Lorens Sjöberg (1754–1822), Swedish officer and poet

Sportspeople
Axel Sjöberg (born 1991), Swedish footballer
Axel Sjöberg (born 1995), Swedish curler
Göran Sjöberg (born 1960), Swedish ice hockey player and coach
Henrik Sjöberg (1875–1905), Swedish athlete and gymnast
Johanna Sjöberg (born 1978), Swedish international swimmer
Kjell Sjöberg (1937–2013), Swedish ski jumper
Lars-Erik Sjöberg (1944–1987), Swedish ice hockey player
Mathias Sjöberg (born 1988), Swedish ice hockey player
Patrik Sjöberg (born 1965), Swedish high jumper
Paul Sjöberg (1897–1978), Finnish Olympic sailor

Other people
Alf Sjöberg (1903–1980), Swedish film director
Carl Leopold Sjöberg (1861–1900), Swedish composer
Emma Sjöberg (born 1968), Swedish fashion model and actress
Erik Sjöberg (historian)
Laura Sjoberg (born 1979), American scholar of feminist international relations theory
Magnus Sjöberg (born 1927), Swedish jurist

Other
Sjöberg, Sweden, a small town in Sollentuna municipality, Sweden

Swedish-language surnames